The Battle of Chumonchin Chan or the action of 2 July 1950 was the battle fought between surface combatants during the main phase of the Korean War. It began after an Allied flotilla encountered a Korean People's Navy supply fleet.

Battle
The North Korean torpedo boats began an attack on the allied ships.

Before their torpedoes could be fired however, they were met with a salvo of gunfire from the United Nations ships which destroyed three of the torpedo boats. The surviving North Korean craft fled. Later in July, Juneau encountered the same ammunition ships and destroyed them.

Sinking USS Baltimore
The Victorious War Museum in Pyongyang, North Korea, has several exhibits that claim the  USS Baltimore (CA-68) was sunk by the motor torpedo boats belonging to the Korean People's Navy. Exhibits include a poster and the "actual" boat which supposedly sank the American cruiser. However, the ship was in the U.S. Navy’s decommissioned reserve from 1946 to 1951 before being recommissioned and assigned to the Atlantic Fleet. In 1955, the Baltimore was transferred to the Pacific Fleet two years after the end of the Korean War.

Sources

Battles and operations of the Korean War in 1950  
Battles of the Korean War involving North Korea
Battles of the Korean War involving the United States
Battles of the Korean War involving the United Kingdom 
Chumonchin Chan
Chumonchin Chan
Chumonchin Chan
History of Gangwon Province, South Korea
July 1950 events in Asia